Rowallan is a historic site in Ormond Beach, Florida, United States. It is located at 253 John Anderson Highway. On October 6, 1988, it was added to the U.S. National Register of Historic Places.

The Lindsay family

The following is from memories of descendants of Alexander Millar Lindsay (1841–1920), builder and first owner of Rowallan, and from a book for which this descendant did research, "Alexander Millar Lindsay," by relative David C. Sargent.  More information about Alexander Millar Lindsay and the store he co-founded, Sibley, Lindsay and Curr Co. is available at The Department of Rare Books and Manuscripts, Rush Rhees Library, University of Rochester, Rochester, New York.

You may also consult the City of Rochester website for Mt. Hope Cemetery. Lindsay and his wife and many of their children are buried in Mt. Hope. It is one of the nations' finest Victorian Park Cemeteries.

Also architecturally significant is Lindsay's home in Rochester, New York.  It was designed by J. G. Cutler, who invented the mail chute. Currently doctors' offices, it is located at 973 East Avenue across the street from the home of Eastman Kodak founder, George Eastman (now the International Museum of Photography).  Lindsay served as a board member at Kodak.

Through the apprentice system, Lindsay became expert in piece goods. In 1865, he and countryman John Curr sailed from Glasgow to Boston to an apprenticeship with wholesaler Hogg, Brown and Taylor.  There, Lindsay met James M. Thomson who would co-found Hartford, Connecticut's premier department store, Brown Thomson Co. Lindsay's youngest child, Adelaide, would later marry Thomson's eldest son.

Also at Hogg, Brown and Taylor, Lindsay and Curr also met Yankee farmer Rufus Sibley, a fellow clerk.  Hogg, Brown and Taylor encouraged its more talented and ambitious employees to start their own businesses and so encouraged the founding of Sibley, Lindsay and Curr Co. at Rochester, NY in 1868.  It grew to become the largest department store between New York and Cincinnati. The store initiated a policy of charging the same price for all customers.

The honesty of the partners was critical to their future success.  When their newest building burned in 1904, although all store records were destroyed, loyal customers paid their bills and their local insurance agent made funds available to them immediately so that they could begin anew.  The "Great Sibley Fire" remains Rochester's largest.  In 1871, he married Adelaide Hatch (1841–1927).  Adelaide's father, Jesse W. Hatch automated the production of shoes, invented baby shoes and hired the first female clerk in Rochester's history to work in his store.

Rowallan's origins

Rowallan in Ormond Beach was built in 1913 to serve as the winter residence for Alexander Millar Lindsay. Born in Stewarton, Ayrshire, Scotland, this residence was named Rowallan after a castle in his native Ayrshire.

Lindsay's daughter, Jean, designed Rowallan.  According to the correspondence between his son-in-law, attorney Daniel M. Beach, and the appraiser of Rowallan following Lindsay's death, the appraiser wrote: “Miss Lindsay would have it that she could walk out of the house without going down steps.”  This of course led to problems with the water table.  During certain times of the year, water would reach the lower part of the ground floor windows.  Sills had to be replaced frequently because of this.

As for the orchard that was on the grounds, the appraiser noted that it was not productive, that it would cost at least $1.00 to produce a single orange.  Also on the property was a cottage known as Sun Patch named for a favorite Lindsay granddaughter, Sunny Kame. It was the winter residence of Lindsay's eldest daughter, Harriet.

Other residences on John Anderson Highway near Rowallan were built by Scotsmen with similar histories to that of Lindsay.  They referred to themselves as the "Scotch Syndicate2.  When Lindsay died in 1920, his widow caused a memorial fountain to be constructed on the river side of the road.  It was later destroyed by vandals.

Rowallan served as the winter home for the entire extended Lindsay family.  Nannies and children were everywhere.  There are pictures and movies of them in their goat carts, pony carts and swimming at Daytona Beach.  Adults attended functions at the old Ormond Beach Hotel, went shooting and rode horseback.  They drove in horse driven buggies and later in their beach wagon.  They were among the first to drive cars on Ormond Beach.

As of 2008, the extended family of Alexander Millar Lindsay is spread throughout the United States and Europe. However, all remain interested in Rowallan and closely follow its unfolding story.

Rowallan's later history

According to content about the Ormond Beach Historical Trail written by Orlando historian Steve Rajtar, Rowallen was later owned by Englishman Leonard Martin, and then Harold and Eileen Butts. The Butts renamed the house Linsaroe, which means "by the water" in Celtic. Eileen Butts was added to the state list of prominent Floridians for her work in the area including the creation of Tomoka State Park, the building of the Ormond Memorial Art Gallery and the preservation of John D. Rockefeller's Ormond Beach home The Casements. The plaque listing her as a great Floridian form the state's 2000 program is on the front of Rowallen.

Rowallan's Joy Postle murals

Rowallan also features murals by the noted Florida artist, Joy Postle. Postle, a former WPA artist, is known for her paintings of Florida wildlife scenes and in particular birds. In addition, she was a published poet, author, musician and entertainer. She resided in Orlando, Florida.

References

External links
 Volusia County listings at National Register of Historic Places
 Volusia County listings at Florida's Office of Cultural and Historical Programs

Houses on the National Register of Historic Places in Volusia County, Florida
Ormond Beach, Florida